Gregory James Wilson (born 4 January 1958 in Launceston, Tasmania) was an Australian cricket player, who played for the Tasmania. He was a right-handed batsman and right arm fast-medium bowler who represented Tasmania from 1979 until 1982.

See also
 List of Tasmanian representative cricketers

External links
Cricinfo Profile

1958 births
Living people
Australian cricketers
Tasmania cricketers
Cricketers from Launceston, Tasmania
Lincolnshire cricketers